Gurū Hargobind (Gurmukhi: ਗੁਰੂ ਹਰਿਗੋਬਿੰਦ, pronunciation: l 19 June 1595 – 28 February 1644), revered as the sixth Nānak, was the sixth of ten Gurus of the Sikh religion. He had become Guru at the young age of eleven, after the execution of his father, Guru Arjan, by the Mughal emperor Jahangir.

Guru Hargobind introduced the process of militarization to Sikhism, likely as a response to his father's execution and to protect the Sikh community. He symbolized it by wearing two swords, representing the dual concept of mīrī and pīrī (temporal power and spiritual authority). In front of the Harmandir Sahib in Amritsar, Guru Hargobind constructed the Akal Takht (the throne of the timeless one). The Akal Takht represents the highest seat of earthly authority of the Khalsa (the collective body of the Sikhs) today.

Biography
He suffered from smallpox as a child. According to hagiographies written by the orthodox Sikh tradition he survived a poisoning attempt by his uncle Prithi Chand, as well as another attempt on his life, when a cobra was thrown at him. He studied religious texts with Bhai Gurdas and trained in swordsmanship and archery with Baba Budda (not to be confused with the Gautama Buddha).

On 25 May 1606 Guru Arjan, five days before his own death, selected his son Hargobind as his successor and instructed his son to start a military tradition to protect the Sikh people and always keep himself surrounded by armed Sikhs for protection. Shortly afterwards, Guru Arjan was arrested, tortured and killed by order of the Mughal Emperor Jahangir.  Guru Hargobind's succession ceremony took place on 24 June 1606. He put on two swords: one indicated his spiritual authority (pīrī) and the other, his temporal authority (mīrī). He followed his martyred father's advice and always kept himself surrounded by armed Sikhs for protection. The number fifty-two was special in his life, and his retinue consisted of fifty-two armed men. He thus founded the military tradition in the Sikh faith.

Guru Hargobind had three wives: Damodari, Nanaki, and Marvahi. He had children from three wives. Two of his eldest sons from the first wife died during his lifetime. Guru Tegh Bahadur, his son from Mata Nanaki, became the ninth Sikh Guru. The Sodhis of Anandpur Sahib are the descendants of Baba Suraj Mal Sodhi, one of Guru Hargobind's sons.

The Guru was a martial artist (shastarvidyā) and he encouraged people to maintain physical fitness and keep their bodies ready for physical combat. He had his own Darbar (court). The arming and training of some of his devoted followers began. The Guru came to possess seven hundred horses and his Risaldari (army) grew to three hundred horsemen and sixty musketeers.

He nominated his grandson to succeed him as the seventh Guru Har Rai. He died in 1644 at Kiratpur Sahib, a town situated on the banks of river Sutlej, and was cremated on the banks of River Sutlej, where now stands Gurdwara Patalpuri Sahib.

Relations with other rulers

Guru Hargobind led the Sikh response against Mughal power after Guru Arjan's execution. He nominally accepted Shah Jahan's authority but resisted the Islamic persecution, fighting four wars against Shah Jahan's armies. His attempts to transform the Sikh community brought him in conflict with the Mughal authority.

Jahangir
Along with the execution of Guru Arjan by Mughal Emperor Jahangir, Guru Hargobind from the very start was a dedicated enemy of the Mughal rule. He advised Sikhs to arm and fight the Mughals. The death of his father at the hands of Jahangir prompted him to emphasise the military dimension of the Sikh community. He symbolically wore two swords, which represented miri piri. He built a fort to defend Ramdaspur and created a formal court, Akal Takht.

Jahangir responded by jailing the 14-year-old Guru Hargobind at Gwalior Fort in 1609, on the pretext that the fine imposed on Guru Arjan had not been paid by the Sikhs and Guru Hargobind. It is not clear as to how much time he spent as a prisoner. The year of his release appears to have been either 1611 or 1612, when Guru Hargobind was about 16 years old. Persian records, such as Dabistān-e Mazāhib suggest he was kept in jail for twelve years, including over 1617–1619 in Gwalior, after which he and his camp were kept under Muslim army's surveillance by Jahangir.

It is unclear why he was released. Scholars suggest that Jahangir had more or less reverted to tolerant policies of Akbar by about 1611 after he felt secure about his throne, and the Sunnis and Naqshbandhi court officials at the Mughal court had fallen out of his favour. Another theory states that Jahangir discovered the circumstances and felt Guru Hargobind was harmless, so he ordered his release.

According to Surjit Singh Gandhi, 52 Rajas who were imprisoned in the fort as hostages for "millions of rupees" and for opposing the Mughal empire were dismayed as they were losing a spiritual mentor. Guru Hargobind requested the Rajas to be freed along with him as well and stood surety for their loyal behavior. Jahangir ordered their release as well. Guru Hargobind got a special gown stitched which had 52 hems. As Guru Hargobind left the fort, the captive kings caught the hems of the cloak and came out along with him.

After his release, Guru Hargobind more discreetly strengthened the Sikh army and reconsolidated the Sikh community. His relations with Jahangir remained mostly friendly. He accompanied Jahangir to Kashmir and Rajputana and subdued Tara Chand of Nalagarh, who had continued for a long time in open rebellion and all efforts to subdue him had failed. During Jahangir's reign, Guru Hargobind fought a battle against the Mughals at Rohilla. The battle was in response to the militarisation of the Sikhs. The Mughals who were led by Governor Abdul Khan were defeated by the Sikhs.

Shah Jahan
During the reign of Shah Jahan that started in 1627, relations became bitter again. Shah Jahan was intolerant. He destroyed the Sikh baoli at Lahore. In 1628, Shah Jahan's hunting party plundered some of Guru Hargobind's property, which triggered the first armed conflict.

Guru Hargobind's army fought battles with the Mughal armies of Shah Jahan at Amritsar, Kartarpur and elsewhere. Guru Hargobind defeated the Mughal troops near Amritsar in the Battle of Amritsar in 1634. The Guru was again attacked by a provincial detachment of Mughals, but the attackers were routed and their leaders slain. Guru Hargobind also led his armies against the provincial Muslim governors. The Guru anticipated the return of a larger Mughal force, so retreated into Shivalik Hills to strengthen his defenses and army, with a base in Kiratpur where he continued to stay till his death.

Painde Khan was appointed the leader of the provincial troops by Shah Jahan and marched upon the Guru. Guru Hargobind was attacked, but he won this battle as well. Guru Hargobind also fought the Battle of Kartarpur. Chandu Shah, Guru Arjan's killer, was killed through torture by the Sikhs of Guru Hargobind, a thick iron ring was put around his nose and he was dragged on the floor till the man who killed Guru Arjan, who became a Sikh, poured hot sand on him from the same ladle which was used on Guru Arjan.

Guru Hargobind lost his eldest son Baba Gurdita in 1638. Shah Jahan attempted political means to undermine the Sikh tradition, by dividing and influencing the succession. The Mughal ruler gave land grants to Baba Gurdita's eldest son Dhir Mal, living in Kartarpur, and attempted to encourage Sikhs to recognise Dhir Mal as the rightful successor to Guru Hargobind. Dhir Mal issued statements in favour of the Mughal state, and critical of his grandfather. Guru Hargobind died at Kiratpur Rupnagar, Punjab, on 28 February 1644, but before his death, he rejected his eldest grandson Dhir Mal's politics, and nominated Guru Har Rai (Dhir Mal's younger brother) instead to succeed him as the Guru. The pattern was repeated when Guru Har Rai chose his second son as his successor instead of his eldest son.

Samarth Ramdas and Guru Hargobind 

According to Sikh tradition based on an old Punjabi manuscript Panjah Sakhian, Samarth Ramdas met Guru Hargobind (1595–1644) at Srinagar in the Garhval hills. The meeting, corroborated in a Marathi source, Ramdas Swami's Bakhar, by Hanumant Swami, written in 1793, probably took place in the early 1630s during Samarth Ramdas's pilgrimage travels in the north and Guru Hargobind's journey to Nanakmata in the east. It is said that as they came face to face with each other, Guru Hargobind had just returned from a hunting excursion. He was fully armed and rode a horse. "I had heard that you occupied the Gaddi of Guru Nanak", said the Maratha saint Ramdas, and asked what sort of sadhu was he. Guru Hargobind replied, "Internally a hermit, and externally a prince. Arms mean protection to the poor and destruction of the tyrant. Guru Nanak had not renounced the world but had renounced Maya".

Battles and skirmishes

 Battle of Rohilla (1630)
 Battle of Amritsar (1634)
 Battle of Lahira, 1634
 Battle for Maham
 Battle of Padiala
 Battle of Kiratpur
 Battle of Kartarpur, 1635
 Battle of Phagwara, 1635

Popular culture
The animated Punjabi movie Dastaan-E-Miri Piri is about Guru Hargobind and his contribution to the Sikh faith and community.

Gallery

See also 

 Mata Kaulan
 Akal Sena

References

Further reading
 Dr Harjinder Singh Dilgeer (2012), SIKH HISTORY in 10 volumes, Sikh University Press.

External links

 Guru Hargobind

1595 births
1644 deaths
Sikh warriors
Sikh gurus
Punjabi people